Life in Cartoon Motion is the debut album released by British singer-songwriter Mika. The album was produced by Greg Wells, mixed by Wells, with co-production on two songs by Jodi Marr and John Merchant. The album was released via Casablanca Records on 5 February 2007 in the United Kingdom, and on 27 March 2007 in the United States.<p>

Life in Cartoon Motion  was the #9 top selling album in the world in 2007. The album's lead single, "Grace Kelly", stayed at number one on the UK Singles Chart for five consecutive weeks and became a worldwide number-one hit.

Background
Prior to obtaining his record deal, Mika sent demos to many record companies in Britain, but was never signed. One record label in particular claimed that Mika had a good voice, but insisted he write more conventional songs like Robbie Williams in order to become more commercial. Mika rejected this advice. The song "Grace Kelly" was inspired by these problems. In 2006 Mika signed with Island Records and began recording his debut album. His musical influences are based in classical music. Before Mika released his debut album, he promised the media that "It was a magical world that you could live in. A parallel universe for people that is illusory and enchanting and amazing." Some songs on the album are sexually ambiguous, which prompted some questioning regarding Mika's sexuality. On this, Mika commented that he has no taboos about what he can use to tell a story or what stories he can actually tell, and said that while he believes that sexualising music is great, politically sexualising music and making the artist's sexuality the defining point of someone's music is "boring". He said about his own sexuality: "laying myself out on the table to almost a tabloid level and kind of sharing my entire personal life, I'm really not into that." The songs on the album have different subjects. "Grace Kelly", as stated before, is about the struggle of getting a record deal. Mika stated that the song is important because "it's a flagpole for the record in terms of lyrical content and the whole pop vision I wanted to get across." The cover for the album and booklet were designed by Mika's sister, Yasmine, who works under the pen name DaWack, Richard Hogg and Mika himself. In March 2007 the album was released in the United States. Before its release there was much publicity about the album, mainly due to its success in Europe. Mika commented on the hype by saying: "I think I'm lucky. Hype can be good and hype can be bad. The good thing that's happening to me is that the hype is about the project, it's about the music ... I'm not the son of anyone famous, I haven't really slept with anyone particularly well-known ... it's really just about music, and that's something I think is very healthy."

Reception

Initial critical response to Life in Cartoon Motion was generally mixed. On Metacritic, which assigns a normalised rating out of 100 to reviews from mainstream critics, the album received an average score of 55, based on 23 reviews, indicating "mixed or average reviews".  In January 2007, Mika was considered the best new talent in the BBC's Sound of 2007 music poll. About 130 music critics and broadcasters from the UK agreed that Mika was the sound of 2007.

The album received highly polarised reviews, earning one star from The Guardian and four stars in the London Evening Standard. The album received a score of 1 out of 10 from the Drowned in Sound website, which prompted Brian May of Queen, a fan of Mika, to criticise the website for making unnecessary personal attacks on Mika.

Release
The original version of the album, released in the United Kingdom and Europe on 5 February 2007, contains a total of 12 tracks, including the hidden track "Over My Shoulder" and the bonus track "Ring Ring". It also includes an enhanced section, with links to music videos and live performances, as well as other exclusive content. The version released via the iTunes Store in Europe features three additional acoustic recordings as bonus tracks. The American version of the album, released on 27 March 2007, is essentially the same as the British release, however, it includes the exclusive bonus track "Erase", not included on the original release. American versions of the album bought at Best Buy stores also carry two exclusive bonus tracks - acoustic versions of "Love Today" and "Satellite", while the American iTunes Store version also includes an exclusive acoustic version of "Grace Kelly". The version of the album released in Japan is essentially the same as the original British release, however, it also includes the American exclusive track "Erase", as well as the Japanese exclusive track "Your Sympathy", and an enhanced element containing the music video for "Grace Kelly".

The demo version of the album, issued to media journalists and critics, has a very different track listing than any of the main versions of the albums. It does not include the tracks "Lollipop", "Big Girl (You Are Beautiful)" and "Over My Shoulder", but does include the Japanese only bonus track "Your Sympathy", as well as including "Gave It All Away", Mika's original version of the track, before it was given to Boyzone. Mika's version had never appeared on any other release, until the release of the Asian Tour Edition in March 2008, which includes the eleven standard tracks from the British album, the European bonus track "Ring Ring", "Gave It All Away" from the demo version, "Erase" from the American version, "Your Sympathy" from the Japanese edition, and the B-side recordings "Satellite", "Only Lonely One" and "Instant Martyr". The album was also packed with a bonus disc, including six acoustic recordings, four live recordings, and the single mix of "Happy Ending".

Chart performance
The album had significant success in Europe, with the album achieving 1.65 million certified sales in the United Kingdom and 1.45 million in France. The album was certified five-times platinum in Belgium and two-times platinum in Switzerland, and three-times platinum in Ireland, also achieving gold and/or platinum status in Spain, Portugal, the Netherlands, Austria, Hungary, Italy, Russia, Norway, Sweden, Finland, Denmark, Germany and Greece. The album also charted in the Czech Republic and was certified in Japan. In Oceania, the album was certified two-times platinum in Australia and gold in New Zealand. In North America, the album was certified two-times platinum in Canada.

Track listing

Personnel
 Mika – lead vocals, piano, keyboards, guitar, backing vocals, percussion, programming
 Greg Wells – producer, mixer, guitar, bass, drums, programming, percussion, keyboards
 Tim Pierce – guitar
 Dylan Schiavone – guitar
 Lyle Workman – guitar
 Dan Rothchild – bass 
 Matt Chamberlain – drums 
 Derek Cintron – percussion
 Fabien-Waltmann – programming
 Backing vocals by: Zuleika Penniman, Paloma Penniman, Fortuné Penniman, Audrey Moukataff, Alexander Millar and Ida Falk Winland

Orchestra
 Larry Corbett – cello
 Lee Thornburg – horns
 The Spoon Orchestra of Chiswick – orchestra
 Studio Gospel Choir – backing vocals
 Maxi Anderson – choir leader
 Paul Buckmaster – string arrangement
 Jerry Hey – brass arrangement

Production
 Jodi Marr – producer, percussion
 John Merchant – producer, recording engineer
 Joe Zook – recording engineer
 Carlos Alvarez – recording engineer
 Joe Chiccarelli – recording engineer
 Chris Nicoladies –  recording engineer 
 Drew Pearson – recording engineer

Charts

Weekly charts

Year-end charts

Decade-end charts

Certifications

References

External links
Mika's official website
Greg Wells
Interview with Greg Wells about producing the album
Jodi Marr

Mika (singer) albums
2007 debut albums
Festival Records albums
Mushroom Records albums
Casablanca Records albums
Albums produced by Greg Wells